Marko Miladinović (born 7 December 2000) is a Serbian tennis player.

Miladinović has a career high ATP singles ranking of world No. 451 achieved on 13 January 2020.

Miladinović has a career high ITF junior combined ranking of world No. 2 achieved on 1 January 2018.

ATP Challenger Tour and ITF Futures finals

Singles: 7 (3–4)

Doubles: 1 (1–0)

References

External links

2000 births
Living people
Serbian male tennis players
Tennis players from Belgrade
Tennis players at the 2018 Summer Youth Olympics